Franziska ("Franzi") Gude (born 19 March 1976 in Göttingen, Lower Saxony) is a field hockey midfielder from Germany, who won the gold medal with the German National Women's Team at the 2004 Summer Olympics in Athens, Greece.

International Senior Tournaments
 1999 – Champions Trophy, Brisbane (3rd place)
 1999 – European Nations Cup, Cologne (2nd place)
 2000 – Olympic Qualifying Tournament, Milon Keynes (3rd place)
 2000 – Champions Trophy, Amstelveen (2nd place)
 2000 – Summer Olympics, Sydney (7th place)
 2002 – European Indoor Nations Cup, France (1st place)
 2002 – World Cup, Perth (7th place)
 2003 – World Indoor Nations Cup, Leipzig (1st place)
 2003 – Champions Challenge, Catania (1st place)
 2003 – European Nations Cup, Barcelona (3rd place)
 2004 – Olympic Qualifier, Auckland (4th place)
 2004 – Summer Olympics, Athens (1st place)

References
Profile on Hockey Olympica
Personal website

External links
 

1976 births
Living people
German female field hockey players
Olympic field hockey players of Germany
Field hockey players at the 2000 Summer Olympics
Field hockey players at the 2004 Summer Olympics
Olympic gold medalists for Germany
Olympic medalists in field hockey
Medalists at the 2004 Summer Olympics
Sportspeople from Göttingen
21st-century German women